Henry's Lake National Forest was established as the Henry's Lake Forest Reserve by the U.S. Forest Service in Idaho on May 23, 1905 with .  It became a National Forest on March 4, 1907. On July 1, 1908 the entire forest was combined with a portion of Yellowstone National Forest to establish  Targhee National Forest and the name was discontinued.

References

External links
Forest History Society
Forest History Society:Listing of the National Forests of the United States Text from Davis, Richard C., ed. Encyclopedia of American Forest and Conservation History. New York: Macmillan Publishing Company for the Forest History Society, 1983. Vol. II, pp. 743-788.

Former National Forests of Idaho